Causapscal Lake (Lac Causapscal) is a fresh water body located in the unorganized territory of Lac-Casault in La Matapédia Regional County Municipality in the Bas-Saint-Laurent region of Quebec, Canada.

See also
Matapédia Valley

References 

Lakes of Bas-Saint-Laurent